Eupithecia separata is a moth in the family Geometridae. It is found in Turkey and Armenia.

References

Moths described in 1879
separata
Moths of Asia